Brookhattan was an American soccer club based in New York City that was a member of the professional American Soccer League (ASL).

Formed in 1933, they joined the American Soccer League and won the first half of the league's 1933 season. Following that league's collapse they joined an identically named league in late 1933. In 1942 they won the Lewis Cup, and in 1945 the ASL, National Challenge Cup and Lewis Cup.

In 1948, coffee importer Eugene Diaz, previous owner of New York Galicia, bought the team. In that year they finished second in the 1948 National Challenge Cup.

During the 1948-49 season, Pito Villanon led the ASL in scoring. In the 1949-50 season, Joe Gaetjens was the top scorer in the ASL. Pito Villanon led the ASL in scoring in 1952-53 and was also the ASL MVP. They finished runner-up in the ASL in 1954.

The club would later change its name to Brookhattan-Galicia, Galicia, and Galacia-Honduras, before ceasing activity in 1962.

References

Men's soccer clubs in New York (state)
Defunct soccer clubs in New York City
Association football clubs established in 1933
American Soccer League (1933–1983) teams
U.S. Open Cup winners
1933 establishments in New York City
1962 disestablishments in New York (state)